Eupithecia sacrimontis is a moth in the family Geometridae. It is found in China.

References

Moths described in 1938
sacrimontis
Moths of Asia